The Minotaure was a 74-gun ship of the line of the Royal French Navy, constructed between 1755 and 1757 at the Brest Arsenal in Brest, Brittany.

History 
Between 1755 and 1757 the Minotaure was constructed by the Jacques-Luc Coulomb Company at the Brest Arsenal in Brest, Brittany.  She was launched in February 1757 and commissioned in March 17578. In 1759 the ship was deployed to Mauritius.

While in Mauritius, the ship was commanded by Captain Anne Marie Charles de la Bourdonnaye and joined the Count of Aché's 'Indian Squadron'.  On 10 September 1759, the squadron moved towards southern India planning on intercepting the Royal British Navy squadron moving into the area near Pondichéry.  Shortly after arrival, the squadron engaged the British at the Battle of Pondicherry, which was indecisive.  On 10 September 1759, the Captain Bourdonnaye was removed, but his replacement is unknown.

By July 1781, the ship was converted to a floating battery in Saint-Domingue.  In 1785 the ship was hulked in Brest, by order of 31 July 1782 and subsequently stricken from the naval register.  In 1784, she was withdrawn from service, having ever seen battle just once.

In June 1787, she was broken up.

Specifications 
The armament of the ship was as follows:

 Guns
 Lower gundeck: 28 x 36-pounder long guns
 Upper gundeck: 30 x 18-pounder long guns
 Quarterdeck: 10 x 8-pounder long guns
 Forecastle: 6 x 8-pounder long gun
 Crew: 759 officers and men
 Length: 168 French feet (51.21 metres)
 Width: 43 French feet 6 inches (14.02 metres)
 Depth: 20 French feet 6 inches (6.66 metres)
 Displacement: 1,500 tonnes

Footnotes

References 

 

Ships of the line of the French Navy
1758 ships